Margravine Cemetery, also known as Hammersmith Cemetery, is in the London Borough of Hammersmith and Fulham. The closest London Underground station is Barons Court.

History
Designed by local architect George Saunders, Margravine Cemetery was opened in 1868 on a site previously occupied by market gardens and orchards, known as Fulham Fields. The first burial took place on 3 November 1869.

Margravine closed for new burials in 1951, when the 16.5 acres of cemetery land were restored by the council and designated a 'Garden of Rest'.

Notable burials and monuments

The cemetery contains a number of distinctive monuments, three of which are listed buildings. Most striking is the green bronze memorial to George Broad, who owned the foundry which made the Eros statue at Piccadilly Circus. Nearest Charing Cross Hospital, the Young family mausoleum is a single-storey building in Gothic architecture style. The third listed grave is that of an Australian gold prospector, with a bas relief of him, opposite the Young family mausoleum.

A screen wall memorial erected by the Commonwealth War Graves Commission (who list it as Hammersmith Old Cemetery) in Section 31 lists all 191 Commonwealth service personnel buried in registered war graves in the cemetery – 186 from World War I and 5 from World War II.

Two J. Lyons and Co. war memorials were relocated from their factory at Greenford to the cemetery in 2002. The World War I memorial is Grade II listed.

There is a memorial to the 13 people killed – 11 of them women – in a 1918 explosion at Blake's munitions factory, Wood Lane. It was unveiled in 1920 and Grade II listed in 2017.

Notable burials
 George Broad, brass and bronze founder
 Sir William Bull, 1st Baronet, solicitor and Conservative politician
 Sir Henry Foreman (1852–1924), Conservative politician
 Peter Leitch (1820–1892), recipient of the Victoria Cross
 Thomas Nicholas (antiquary) (1816–1879), Welsh antiquary and educator
 Edward Charles Williams (1807–1881), English landscape painter
 George Wimpey (businessman) (1855–1913), founder of the construction firm of that name
 William Stephen Bond (1845-1920) founder of W S Bond local funeral directors

Conservation
The cemetery is now a part of the Barons Court Conservation Area, designated in April 1989.

Hammersmith and Fulham council states in its 2008 management plan that the site is designated a Nature Conservation Area of Local Importance. It is a particularly useful space for viewing migrating songbirds, bees and butterflies.

See also
 Mortlake Cemetery, also known as Hammersmith New Cemetery

References

External links

 Friends of Margravine Cemetery website 
 
 London Borough of Hammersmith and Fulham, Margravine Cemetery page

Buildings and structures in the London Borough of Hammersmith and Fulham
Cemeteries in London
Commonwealth War Graves Commission memorials
Fulham
Hammersmith and Fulham cemeteries
World War I memorials in the United Kingdom
World War II memorials in the United Kingdom